Frances Preston may refer to:
 Frances W. Preston (1928–2012), American music executive
 Frances E. L. Preston (1844–1929), organizer and lecturer for the National Women’s Christian Temperance Union

See also
 Frances Campbell-Preston (1918–2022), British courtier
 Francis Preston (1765–1835), American lawyer and politician
 Francis Preston (sailor), British Olympic sailor